The 2009 Saint Francis Red Flash football team represented Saint Francis University as a member of the Northeast Conference (NEC) during the 2009 NCAA Division I FCS football season. The Red Flash were led by eighth-year head coach Dave Opfar and played their home games at DeGol Field. They finished the season 2–9 overall and 1–7 in NEC play to place last.

After the season, on November 30, Opfar resigned following eight seasons as the team's head coach.

Schedule

References

Saint Francis
Saint Francis Red Flash football seasons
Saint Francis Red Flash football